Oleh Mykolayovych Shelayev (born 5 November 1976) is a Ukrainian international footballer who plays for FC Vovchansk.

Career
Shelayev plays in a defensive midfield position and was the captain of his club team, FC Dnipro Dnipropetrovsk. In December 2008 the club loaned him to FC Kryvbas Kryvyi Rih. At the end of the 2008–09 season he signed with FC Metalist Kharkiv.

On 4 January 2015 Shelayev became a sports director of the FC Dnipro Dnipropetrovsk Academy.

International career
He was a member of the Ukraine national team until his retirement from international football in 2007. On 28 April 2004 Shelayev made his debut in home draw against Slovakia. He played in several games for Ukraine in the 2006 FIFA World Cup.

International goals

References

External links
  Official team website
 
 

1976 births
Living people
Footballers from Luhansk
Ukrainian footballers
FC Dnipro players
FC Shakhtar Donetsk players
FC Shakhtar-2 Donetsk players
FC Dnipro-2 Dnipropetrovsk players
FC Dnipro-3 Dnipropetrovsk players
FC Metalurh Donetsk players
FC Zorya Luhansk players
FC Kryvbas Kryvyi Rih players
Ukrainian Premier League players
Ukrainian First League players
Ukrainian Second League players
Ukrainian Amateur Football Championship players
2006 FIFA World Cup players
Ukraine international footballers
FC Metalist Kharkiv players
FC VPK-Ahro Shevchenkivka players
FC Vovchansk players
Association football midfielders
Dnipro Academy people